Cryptolechia eoa is a moth in the family Depressariidae. It was described by Edward Meyrick in 1910. It is found in India (Assam).

The wingspan is about 24 mm. The forewings are light greyish-ochreous, almost wholly suffused with light rose-pink except in the middle of the disc and a narrow whitish-ochreous terminal facia. There are some scattered minute dots and strigulae of blackish scales, as well as a blackish basal fascia and a small black costal spot at three-fifths. The hindwings are light greyish-ochreous, more greyish posteriorly and with three or four grey marks on the upper part of the termen.

References

Moths described in 1910
Cryptolechia (moth)
Taxa named by Edward Meyrick